A skateboarding podcast or skate podcast is a podcast focused on skateboarding.

Notable skateboarding podcasts 
 Jeff Grosso's Loveletters to Skateboarding
 The Nine Club
 BS With TG
 Talkin' Schmit
 The Bunt
 Vent City
 Skate Radio
 The Tim O'Connor Show
Skate Talk
 The Skatepark Project Podcast
 Quell Party
 Mostly Skateboarding
 Savage Radio
 Skating Is Hard
 No Mongo Podcast
 The Big Spin
 The Desiree Show
 Mission Statement
 Ripride
 Weekend Buzz
 Skate Fillet
 Thrill of it All
 Skatosis
 Ripride with Andy Roy
 All I Need
The Bomb Hole
Bathroom Break Podcast

References

External links
Editorial: Skateboarding Podcasts, What's Missing? – by Anthony Pappalardo 
The best 18 Skateboarding Podcasts to listen – by Sasha Zeidler

Sports podcasts
Skateboarding mass media
skateboarding